Čilipi is a village located in the municipality of Konavle, 22 km southeast from the town of Dubrovnik, in southern Croatia. It is connected by the D8 state road. 

Čilipi gives its name to nearby Dubrovnik Airport.

Populated places in Dubrovnik-Neretva County
Konavle